Hebeclinium obtusisquamosum is a species of flowering plant in the family Asteraceae.It is found only in Ecuador. Its natural habitats are subtropical or tropical moist lowland forests and subtropical or tropical moist montane forests. It is threatened by habitat loss.

References

obtusisquamosum
Flora of Ecuador
Vulnerable plants
Taxonomy articles created by Polbot